Meusel is a surname. Notable people with the name include:
 Andreas Meusel (1514–1581), German Lutheran theologian
 Bob Meusel (1896 –1977), American baseball left and right fielder
 Irish Meusel (1893–1963), American baseball left fielder
 Johann Georg Meusel (1743–1820), German bibliographer, lexicographer and historian

See also
 Arctic-Alpine Garden of the Walter Meusel Foundation, Botanical gardens in Germany